SS Marquette may refer to:
  was a lake freighter that sank in 1903.
  1897–1915 was a British troopship that was torpedoed off south of Salonica, Greece with the loss of 167 lives.
  was a train ferry that disappeared with all hands on Lake Erie
  is an American steamship that served from 1942 to 2008. She is currently in long term layup. 

Ship names